Ageykin (masculine) or Ageykina (feminine) is a Russian last name, a variant of Ageyev.

People with the last name
Irina Ageikina (Ageykina), 2008 winner in the Best Female Performance category at the Eurasia International Film Festival
Sergei Ageikin (Sergey Ageykin), Russian ice hockey player who died during his playing career

References

Notes

Sources
И. М. Ганжина (I. M. Ganzhina). "Словарь современных русских фамилий" (Dictionary of Modern Russian Last Names). Москва, 2001. 



Russian-language surnames